Wilbur Eugene Young, Jr. (April 20, 1949 – July 5, 2014) was an American professional football player who was a defensive lineman in the National Football League (NFL) for the Kansas City Chiefs, San Diego Chargers and Washington Redskins. He also played for the Arizona Wranglers of the United States Football League (USFL).

Early life
Young was born in New York City, New York and attended James Monroe High School in the Bronx.

College career
Young played college football at William Penn College in Oskaloosa, Iowa.  While attending William Penn, he was a two-time 1st Team All-Conference defensive tackle. In 1969 and 1970, he was named a National Association of Intercollegiate Athletics (NAIA) All-American. As a senior, Young was invited to play in the Chicago College All-Star Game. In addition to football, he also lettered and set a school record in the shot put for the track and field program.  He graduated from William Penn in May 1971 with a Bachelor's degree in Physical Education.  Young was inducted into the William Penn Athletic Hall of Fame in 1985 and the NAIA Hall of Fame in 2002.

Professional career

NFL
Young was drafted in the second round (39th overall) of the 1971 NFL Draft by the Kansas City Chiefs, where he played from 1971 to 1977.  After the 1978 NFL Draft, during which the Chiefs drafted defensive players Art Still and Sylvester Hicks, Young was traded to the San Diego Chargers for wide receiver Larry Dorsey.  He played for the Chargers from 1978 to 1980.  In 1979 with San Diego, starting defensive tackle Louie Kelcher was sidelined for all but three minutes after a knee operation, but Young filled in and was named All-Pro by Sports Illustrated and United Press International.  In 1981, he was traded to the Washington Redskins for offensive lineman Jeff Williams.  However, in November 1981, the Redskins cut Young.  He was then claimed by the Chargers, where he finished the season and played in 1982.

USFL
In 1984, Young played for the Arizona Wranglers of the United States Football League.

Coaching career
After retiring from football, Young became an assistant coach at Monticello High School in Charlottesville, Virginia during which he helped lead the football team to their first state championship appearance in 2003 and first state championship victory in 2007.  He also coached shot put for the Monticello track and field team.

Personal life

He had one child a daughter Desiree Irwin with Sharon Irwin of Roseville, Kansas. 

Young lived in Charlottesville, Virginia, where he worked at several homes for wayward boys and challenged adults, coached high school sports and worked in the customer service industry.

Young died on July 5, 2014 at Martha Jefferson Hospital in Charlottesville.

References

External links
 
 

1949 births
2014 deaths
American football defensive linemen
Kansas City Chiefs players
San Diego Chargers players
Arizona Wranglers players
Washington Redskins players
William Penn Statesmen football players
James Monroe High School (New York City) alumni